Karen Culp may refer to:
A voice actress for Kenny the Shark
A student who died in Room 212 in the Our Lady of the Angels School Fire